Ivan Rybovalov (born November 29, 1981 in Simferopol) is a Ukrainian sport shooter.

Career
He won two bronze medals in both air and free pistol at the ISSF World Cup series (2005 in Changwon, South Korea, and 2007 in Munich, Germany).

Rybovalov represented Ukraine at the 2008 Summer Olympics in Beijing, where he competed in two pistol shooting events, along with his teammate Oleg Omelchuk. He scored a total of 572 targets in the preliminary rounds of the men's 10 m air pistol, by three points behind Vietnam's Nguyễn Mạnh Tường from the final attempt, finishing only in thirty-fifth place. Three days later, Rybovalov placed twentieth in his second event, 50 m pistol, by one point ahead of United States' Jason Turner from the final attempt, with a total score of 553 targets.

References

External links
NBC 2008 Olympics profile

Ukrainian male sport shooters
Living people
Olympic shooters of Ukraine
Shooters at the 2008 Summer Olympics
Sportspeople from Simferopol
1981 births
21st-century Ukrainian people